The spider genus Steatoda, in the family Theridiidae, includes about 120 recognized species, distributed around the world (including many cosmopolitan species which are found among human populations worldwide). One common name is cupboard spider, for many species build their webs in dark, sheltered, undisturbed places around the house or garden, in sheds and garages, under garden furniture, compost bins, and the like. Signs of the cupboard spider include small white spots of spider droppings, like small splashes of paint, on the floor underneath the web.

Many spiders of the genus Steatoda are often mistaken for widow spiders (Latrodectus), and are known as false widows. They are closely related (in the family Theridiidae) but Steatoda are significantly less harmful to humans. Not all Steatoda species resemble black widows – they come in many different colors and sizes, mostly smaller than Latrodectus species. Steatoda paykulliana can grow larger than the black widow, and Steatoda castanea looks more like a brown widow.

Like other theridiids, they often feed on other spiders that get tangled up in their webs. Steatoda grossa sometimes preys on black widows.

Description
The colour can range from sandy pale brown to reddish plum to satiny black. Like most spiders, its cephalothorax is smaller than its abdomen, which is somewhat egg-shaped, and can have white or beige to orange markings. Although sometimes not or partially visible, these markings usually consists of a frontal crescent, often with a dorsal line or triangular shapes or both. Orange to reddish-marked Steatoda paykulliana can be mistaken for the redback spider).

In common with other members of the family Theridiidae, Steatoda construct a tangled web, i.e., an irregular tangle of sticky silken fibers. As with other web-weavers, these spiders have very poor eyesight and depend mostly on vibrations reaching them through their webs to orient themselves to prey or to warn them of larger animals that could injure or kill them.

Species
, the World Spider Catalog accepted the following extant species:

Steatoda adumbrata (Simon, 1908) – Australia (Western Australia)
Steatoda aethiopica (Simon, 1909) – Central Africa
Steatoda alamosa Gertsch, 1960 – US, Mexico
Steatoda alboclathrata (Simon, 1897) – India
Steatoda albomaculata (De Geer, 1778) – North America, Europe, North Africa to Israel, Russia (Europe to Far East), Central Asia, China, Korea, Japan
Steatoda ancora (Grube, 1861) – Russia (south Siberia)
Steatoda ancorata (Holmberg, 1876) – Mexico to Chile
Steatoda andina (Keyserling, 1884) – Venezuela to Chile
Steatoda apacheana Gertsch, 1960 – US
Steatoda atascadera Chamberlin & Ivie, 1942 – US
Steatoda atrocyanea (Simon, 1880) – New Caledonia, Loyalty Is.
Steatoda autumnalis (Banks, 1898) – Mexico
Steatoda badia (Roewer, 1961) – Senegal
Steatoda bertkaui (Thorell, 1881) – Indonesia (Moluccas), New Guinea
Steatoda bipunctata (Linnaeus, 1758) (type species) – Europe, Turkey, Caucasus, Russia (Europe to Far East), Iran, Central Asia, China. Introduced to South America
Steatoda borealis (Hentz, 1850) – US, Canada
Steatoda bradyi (Strand, 1907) – South Africa
Steatoda capensis Hann, 1990 – South Africa, Lesotho. Introduced to St. Helena, Australia, New Zealand
Steatoda carbonaria (Simon, 1907) – Congo, Equatorial Guinea (Bioko)
Steatoda caspia Ponomarev, 2007 – Kazakhstan
Steatoda castanea (Clerck, 1757) – Europe, Turkey, Russia (Europe to Far East), Caucasus, Iran, Central Asia, China. Introduced to Canada
Steatoda chinchipe Levi, 1962 – Ecuador, Peru
Steatoda cingulata (Thorell, 1890) – China, India, Korea, Vietnam, Laos, Japan, Indonesia (Sumatra, Java)
Steatoda connexa (O. Pickard-Cambridge, 1904) – South Africa
Steatoda craniformis Zhu & Song, 1992 – China
Steatoda dahli (Nosek, 1905) – Turkey, Israel, Caucasus, Russia (Europe) to Central Asia
Steatoda diamantina Levi, 1962 – Brazil
Steatoda distincta (Blackwall, 1859) – Madeira
Steatoda ephippiata (Thorell, 1875) – Algeria to Israel, Iran
Steatoda erigoniformis (O. Pickard-Cambridge, 1872) – East Mediterranean to Middle East, Caucasus, China, Korea, Japan. Introduced to the Caribbean.
Steatoda fagei (Lawrence, 1964) – South Africa
Steatoda fallax (Blackwall, 1865) – Cape Verde Is.
Steatoda felina (Simon, 1907) – Congo
Steatoda foravae Dippenaar-Schoeman & Müller, 1992 – South Africa
Steatoda grandis Banks, 1901 – US
Steatoda grossa (C. L. Koch, 1838) – Europe, Turkey, Caucasus, Russia (Europe to Far East), Central Asia, China, Korea, Japan. Introduced to North America, Ecuador, Peru, Chile, Hawaii Is., Macaronesia, Algeria, New Zealand
Steatoda gui Zhu, 1998 – China
Steatoda hespera Chamberlin & Ivie, 1933 – US, Canada
Steatoda hui Zhu, 1998 – China
Steatoda ifricola Lecigne, Lips, Moutaouakil & Oger, 2020 – Morocco
Steatoda iheringi (Keyserling, 1886) – Brazil, Paraguay, Argentina
Steatoda incomposita (Denis, 1957) – Portugal, Spain, France (incl. Corsica)
Steatoda kiwuensis (Strand, 1913) – Central Africa
Steatoda kuytunensis Zhu, 1998 – China
Steatoda latifasciata (Simon, 1873) – Canary Is. to Israel
Steatoda lawrencei Brignoli, 1983 – South Africa
Steatoda lenzi (Strand, 1907) – South Africa
Steatoda leonardi (Thorell, 1898) – Myanmar
Steatoda lepida (O. Pickard-Cambridge, 1880) – New Zealand
Steatoda linzhiensis Hu, 2001 – China
Steatoda livens (Simon, 1894) – Australia (Tasmania)
Steatoda longurio (Simon, 1909) – Central Africa
Steatoda mainlingensis (Hu & Li, 1987) – Kyrgyzstan, China
Steatoda mainlingoides Yin, Griswold, Bao & Xu, 2003 – China
Steatoda marmorata (Simon, 1910) – South Africa
Steatoda marta Levi, 1962 – Colombia
Steatoda maura (Simon, 1909) – Mediterranean
Steatoda mexicana Levi, 1957 – US, Mexico
Steatoda micans (Hogg, 1922) – Vietnam
Steatoda minima (Denis, 1955) – Niger
Steatoda moerens (Thorell, 1875) – Algeria, Tunisia
Steatoda moesta (O. Pickard-Cambridge, 1896) – Mexico to Brazil
Steatoda morsitans (O. Pickard-Cambridge, 1885) – South Africa
Steatoda nahuana Gertsch, 1960 – Mexico
Steatoda nasata (Chrysanthus, 1975) – Indonesia (Krakatau), Papua New Guinea (New Ireland), Australia
Steatoda ngipina Barrion & Litsinger, 1995 – Philippines
Steatoda nigrimaculata Zhang, Chen & Zhu, 2001 – China
Steatoda nigrocincta O. Pickard-Cambridge, 1885 – China (Yarkand)
Steatoda niveosignata (Simon, 1908) – Australia (Western Australia)
Steatoda nobilis (Thorell, 1875) – Macaronesia. Introduced to US, Chile, Europe, Turkey, Iran
Steatoda octonotata (Simon, 1908) – Australia (Western Australia)
Steatoda palomara Chamberlin & Ivie, 1935 – US
Steatoda panja Barrion, Barrion-Dupo & Heong, 2013 – China
Steatoda pardalia Yin, Griswold, Bao & Xu, 2003 – China
Steatoda paykulliana (Walckenaer, 1806) – Europe, Mediterranean to Central Asia
Steatoda pengyangensis Hu & Zhang, 2012 – China
Steatoda perakensis Simon, 1901 – Malaysia
Steatoda perspicillata (Thorell, 1898) – Myanmar
Steatoda picea (Thorell, 1899) – Cameroon
Steatoda porteri (Simon, 1900) – Chile
Steatoda punctulata (Marx, 1898) – US, Mexico
Steatoda quadrimaculata (O. Pickard-Cambridge, 1896) – US to Venezuela, Caribbean
Steatoda quaesita (O. Pickard-Cambridge, 1896) – Mexico
Steatoda quinquenotata (Blackwall, 1865) – Cape Verde Is.
Steatoda retorta González, 1987 – Argentina
Steatoda rhombifera (Grube, 1861) – Russia (middle Siberia)
Steatoda rubrocalceolata (Simon, 1907) – Equatorial Guinea (Bioko)
Steatoda rufoannulata (Simon, 1899) – India, Sri Lanka, Sumatra, Java
Steatoda sabulosa (Tullgren, 1901) – Bolivia, Argentina, Chile
Steatoda sagax (Blackwall, 1865) – Cape Verde Is.
Steatoda saltensis Levi, 1957 – Mexico
Steatoda seriata (Simon, 1899) – Indonesia (Sumatra)
Steatoda singoides (Tullgren, 1910) – Tanzania
Steatoda sordidata O. Pickard-Cambridge, 1885 – China (Yarkand)
Steatoda speciosa (Thorell, 1898) – Myanmar
Steatoda spina Gao & Li, 2014 – China
Steatoda subannulata (Kulczyński, 1911) – New Guinea, Papua New Guinea (New Britain)
Steatoda terastiosa Zhu, 1998 – China
Steatoda terebrui Gao & Li, 2014 – China
Steatoda tigrina (Tullgren, 1910) – Tanzania
Steatoda tortoisea Yin, Griswold, Bao & Xu, 2003 – China
Steatoda transversa (Banks, 1898) – US, Mexico
Steatoda trianguloides Levy, 1991 – France (Corsica), Israel
Steatoda triangulosa (Walckenaer, 1802) – Europe, Turkey, Caucasus, Russia (Europe to Far East), Central Asia. Introduced to Canada, US, Canary Is.
Steatoda tristis (Tullgren, 1910) – Tanzania
Steatoda truncata (Urquhart, 1888) – New Zealand
Steatoda ulleungensis Paik, 1995 – Korea
Steatoda uncata Zhang, Chen & Zhu, 2001 – China
Steatoda variabilis (Berland, 1920) – East Africa
Steatoda variata Gertsch, 1960 – US, Mexico
Steatoda variipes (Keyserling, 1884) – Peru
Steatoda vaulogeri (Simon, 1909) – Vietnam
Steatoda venator (Audouin, 1826) – Libya, Egypt
Steatoda violacea (Strand, 1906) – Ethiopia
Steatoda wangi Zhu, 1998 – China
Steatoda wanshou Yin, 2012 – China
Steatoda washona Gertsch, 1960 – US, Mexico
Steatoda xerophila Levy & Amitai, 1982 – Israel
Steatoda xishuiensis Zhang, Chen & Zhu, 2001 – China

Those commonly mistaken for widows include:
 S. borealis. A common species in North America, often mistaken for the black widow (despite being smaller and having colored markings on the dorsal side of the abdomen, rather than the ventral side).
 S. capensis, the black cobweb or false katipo spider. It originates in South Africa, and is found in Australia and New Zealand; in the latter location it is often confused with the katipō spider.
 S. grossa, often known as the cupboard spider. A dark-colored spider which resembles specimens of Latrodectus, though without the characteristic bright marks found on most widow spiders. This spider is known to occasionally prey on true widows. Bites by S. grossa have been known to produce symptoms similar to (but far less severe than) the bites of true widows. Originally from Europe, but now found worldwide.
 S. nobilis. This spider, a native of the Canary Islands, has since been introduced into the United Kingdom and across Europe. It has been claimed that it is the UK's most venomous spider, and sensationalized stories about the bite of Steatoda nobilis have featured in UK newspaper articles. Its bite is reported to be painful, but normally no worse than a wasp sting, although one case was suspected to be a heart seizure caused by an extreme reaction to the bite.
 S. paykulliana, another spider which is often confused with Latrodectus. This one is generally found in the range of Latrodectus tredecimguttatus and is frequently confused with it. Has a medically significant (but not serious) bite.

Other notable and recognizable species in the genus include:
 S. bipunctata. A common house spider in Europe.
 S. triangulosa, the triangulate cobweb spider, a common household spider noted for a pattern of triangles on the dorsal side of its abdomen. Not known to bite; found worldwide.
 S. hespera, the western bud spider. This species is commonly found in the western United States and Canada, where it is an effective predator of the hobo spider. It is often confused with the black widow, despite being significantly smaller (7 to 8 mm) and having no bright-colored markings. Not known to bite humans, but has a venom which is similar to S. paykulliana (a medically significant spider of this genus).

Diet
Steatoda is known to prey on other spiders (including true black widows), crickets, ladybugs, cockroaches, and woodlice.

Bites
Some members of this genus do have bites which are medically significant in humans (such as S. grossa and S. nobilis); however, bites by Steatoda species generally do not have any long-lasting effects. There may be blistering at the site of the bite, and a general malaise lasting for several days. Symptoms can include moderate to severe pain increasing for the first hour (without severe sweating). Some people have reported mild to moderate nausea, headache, and lethargy. The duration of all symptoms and effects can range from 1 to 60 hours.

The symptoms associated with the bite of several Steatoda species are known in the medical profession as steatodism; and have been described as a less-severe form of latrodectism (the symptoms associated with a widow spider bite). The redback spider antivenom has been thought to be effective at treating bites from S. grossa, after it was mistakenly administered to a S. grossa bite victim who was erroneously believed to have been bitten by the far more dangerous redback. (While the redback antivenom appears clinically active against arachnidism caused by Steatoda spiders,[68][100][101][102] as these cases are often mild and the evidence of its effectiveness is limited, this treatment is not recommended.)[90]

They are not aggressive, and most injuries to humans are due to defensive bites delivered when a spider gets unintentionally squeezed or pinched somehow. It is possible that some bites result when a spider mistakes a finger thrust into its web for its normal prey, but ordinarily intrusion by any large creature will cause these spiders to flee.

References

General
Levi, H.W. (1962). The Spider Genera Steatoda and Enoplognatha in America (Araneae, Theridiidae). Psyche 69:11-36. PDF (with key to American species)

External links

The World Spider Catalog
Washington State University: Steatoda Spiders

 
Theridiidae
Araneomorphae genera
Cosmopolitan spiders